Andean potato latent virus (APLV) is a plant pathogenic virus of the family Tymoviridae.

See also 
 Viral diseases of potato

External links
 ICTVdB - The Universal Virus Database: Andean potato latent virus
 Family Groups - The Baltimore Method

Tymoviridae
Viral plant pathogens and diseases